Beinn Trilleachean (840 m) is a mountain in the Grampian Mountains, north of the village of Taynuilt at the head of Loch Etive. It lies on the border of Highland and Argyll and Bute.

A very rocky peak, it is best known for the rock climbing opportunities on the slabs above Loch Etive.

References

Mountains and hills of Highland (council area)
Mountains and hills of Argyll and Bute
Marilyns of Scotland
Corbetts
Climbing areas of Scotland